Dorcadion ganglbaueri is a species of beetle in the family Cerambycidae. It was described by Jakovlev in 1897. It is known from Kazakhstan.

Subspecies
 Dorcadion ganglbaueri ganglbaueri Jakovlev, 1897
 Dorcadion ganglbaueri paveli Danilevsky, 2013

See also 
Dorcadion

References

ganglbaueri
Beetles described in 1897